Justice Hunter may refer to:

Donald Hunter (judge), associate justice and chief justice of the Supreme Court of Indiana
Hocking H. Hunter, associate justice of the Ohio Supreme Court 
John A. Hunter (judge), chief justice of the Utah Supreme Court
Robert N. Hunter Jr., associate justice of the North Carolina Supreme Court
Robert T. Hunter an associate justice of the Washington Supreme Court